The East Friesian is a breed of dairy sheep originating from East Frisia in northern Germany. It is one of the best milk sheep in terms of yield per ewe.

History 
The breed originated from the Friesland area in northern Germany and Holland. In Europe the breed's main purpose is to produce milk. It is also used as a cross for other breeds to improve milk production in non-dairy breeds of sheep.

In 1992 eleven pregnant ewes and four rams were imported into New Zealand from Sweden. The sheep were placed in quarantine in Silverstream. A breeding program was created that used embryo transfer techniques. Only embryos from these original sheep were allowed to be released from the quarantine. In March 1996 the first sheep were released from the quarantine and allowed to leave the farm. These sheep consisted of 40 rams while the rest of the sheep remained in quarantine to expand the flock numbers. Semen sales from the flock were very high with over 50,000 ewes being inseminated. In 1995 the first flock of East Friesians from Silverstream was registered.

Milk production 
The East Friesian produces roughly 300-600 litres of milk, over a 200- to 300-day lactation. There are reports of individual animals with milk yield reaching 900 litres, counting the milk suckled by the lambs, as well as milking by machine. To provide a high milk yield, the ewe must receive a high-quality diet.

Another attraction of the breed is a relatively high average number of lambs born per ewe.

East Friesians are used as either a purebred milking breed or as a crossing breed for other milking sheep. They can raise the average number of lambs born, as well as milk production, when crossed with other milk sheep breeds. They are not a very hardy or adaptable breed, but their cross-breeds can be. Crossing them with the Awassi breed has been a notable success in Mediterranean or semiarid environments. East Friesians crossed with the Lacaune breed have been a success in the Wisconsin environment. East Friesians were not introduced into North America until the 1990s, but since then, on account of their high milk yield, they have rapidly become the breed of choice among commercial sheep milk producers, although generally not in purebred form.

Characteristics 
The Friesian sheep breeds are a heathland type sheep, the land environment in much of Frisia. The group includes related dairy breeds taking their names from, and probably largely originating in, West Friesland and Zeeland. Historically, the sheep were kept in small numbers by households for household milk. They do poorly in large, dense flocks.

In physical appearance, East Friesians have pink noses and their heads and legs are clear of wool. Their heads are naturally  polled. They generally have pale hooves. The most distinctive feature of an East Friesian is its tail, which is described as a "rat-tail" because it is thin and free of wool. There also exists a dark brown variation of East Friesian.

References

Sheep breeds originating in Germany